The 2015 FIBA Europe Under-16 Championship for Women was the 27th edition of the European championship for women's national under-16 basketball teams. A total of 16 teams participated in the competition, which took place in Matosinhos, Portugal, from 13 to 23 August 2015.

The champions were Czech Republic, who defeated Portugal 79–55 to secure their first title in this competition, after being losing finalists in the previous two editions. Portugal achieved their best-ever result in an international basketball competition, having never reached the quarterfinals at this age level. The host nation's Ana Ramos was named the tournament's MVP and selected for the tournament's All-Star Five.

Participating teams

  (Runners-up, 2014 FIBA Europe Under-16 Championship for Women Division B)

  (Winners, 2014 FIBA Europe Under-16 Championship for Women Division B)

  (3rd place, 2014 FIBA Europe Under-16 Championship for Women Division B)

First round
The first-round groups draw took place on 30 November 2014 in Budapest, Hungary. In the first round, the sixteen teams are allocated in four groups of four teams each. The top three teams of each group will qualify to the Second Round. The last team of each group will play in the Classification Group G first, then in the 9th–16th place playoffs.

Group A

Group B

Group C

Group D

Second round
Twelve advancing teams from the First Round will be allocated in two groups of six teams each. The top four teams of each group will advance to the quarterfinals. The last two teams of each group will play for the 9th – 16th places against the teams from the Group G.

Group E

Group F

Classification Group G
The last team of each group of the First Round will compete in this Classification Round.

Classification playoffs for 9th – 16th place

Classification games for 9th – 16th place

Classification games for 13th – 16th place

Classification games for 9th – 12th place

Championship playoffs

Quarterfinals

Classification games for 5th – 8th place

Semifinals

Final classification games

Match for 15th place

Match for 13th place

Match for 11th place

Match for 9th place

Match for 7th place

Match for 5th place

Bronze medal match

Final

Final standings

References

External links
FIBA official website

2015
2015–16 in European women's basketball
2015–16 in Portuguese basketball
International youth basketball competitions hosted by Portugal
International women's basketball competitions hosted by Portugal
Sport in Matosinhos
August 2015 sports events in Europe
2015 in youth sport